William J. Carney (January 27, 1927 – April 1, 2010) was a U.S. Navy signalman and a multiple-term member of the Ohio General Assembly.

Born in Youngstown, Ohio, Carney graduated from South High School. and served in the United States Navy as a signalman in World War II and the Korean War. After the war he was elected as a member of the Ohio General Assembly, serving as the Democratic representative for Trumbull County in 1959–60, 1961–62, and 1965-66. In February 2005 Carney and his wife, Joanne, were honored by Ohio Governor Bob Taft for service to the community; the previous October Carney had been selected to greet President George W. Bush and his wife Laura during a Mahoning Valley visit in October 2004.

References

1927 births
2010 deaths
Politicians from Youngstown, Ohio
United States Navy sailors
United States Navy personnel of World War II
United States Navy personnel of the Korean War
Members of the Ohio House of Representatives
Military personnel from Ohio